Religion in Egypt controls many aspects of social life and is endorsed by law. The state religion of Egypt is Islam. Although estimates vary greatly in the absence of official statistics. Since the 2006 census religion has been excluded, and thus available statistics are estimates made by religious and non-governmental agencies. The country is majority Sunni Muslim (estimated to be 85-95% of the population), with the next largest religious group being Coptic Orthodox Christians (with estimates ranging from  5-15%). The exact numbers are subject to controversy, with Christians alleging that they have been systemically under-counted in existing censuses.

Egypt hosts two major religious institutions. Al-Azhar Mosque, founded in 970 CE by the Fatimids as the first Islamic university in Egypt and the Coptic Orthodox Church of Alexandria established in the middle of the 1st century by Saint Mark.

In Egypt, Muslims and Christians share a common history, national identity, ethnicity, race, culture, and language.

In 2002, under the Mubarak government, Coptic Christmas (January 7) was recognized as an official holiday, though Christians complain of being minimally represented in law enforcement, state security and public office, and of being discriminated against in the workforce on the basis of their religion.

Demographics
In 2010, based on the contested 2006 Census data, estimated that 94.9% of Egyptians are Muslims, 5.1% are Christians, and less than 1% are Jewish, Buddhists, or other religions. The share of Christians in the Egyptian population has according to official statistics been declining with the highest share reported in the past century being in 1927, when the official census put the percentage of Egyptian Christians at 8.3%. In each of the seven subsequent censuses, the percentage shrank, ending at 5.7% in 1996.

However, most Christians refuted these figures, claiming they have been under-counted. Christians maintain that they represent up to 15% or even 25% of the Egyptian population. In 2017 state-owned newspaper Al Ahram claimed that the percentage of Christians ranged from 10 to 15%, similar to the range claimed by the Washington Institute for Near East Policy.

Recent self-identification surveys put the Christian percentage at around 10%, as found by Afrobarometer in 2016 (which estimated the country to be 10.3% Christian and 89.4% Muslim) and by Arab Barometer in 2019 (which estimated it to be 9.6% Christian and 90.3% Muslim).

According to 2015 figures from the Central Intelligence Agency (CIA), Sunni Muslims make up 90% of the population, with Christians making up the remaining 10%. A significant number of Sunni Muslims follow native Sufi orders. There are reportedly close to fifty thousand Ahmadi Muslims in Egypt. Estimates of Egypt's Shia Twelvers and Ismaili community range from 800,000 to about two to three million members.

Most Egyptian Christians belong to the native Coptic Orthodox Church of Alexandria, an Oriental Orthodox Christian church. Other Christian denominations include Armenian Apostolic, Catholic, Maronite and Anglican. The Greek Orthodox Church of Alexandria (an Eastern Orthodox Church) has around 350,000 adherents. The most recent declarations, made by Pope Shenouda III and bishop Morkos of Shubra in 2008, claimed that the number of Orthodox Christians in Egypt was over 12 million. Other estimates made by church officials put this number at 16 million. The Coptic Orthodox Church claimed that these figures are based on regularly updated membership records. Protestant churches claim a membership of about 300,000 Egyptians, and the Coptic Catholic Church is estimated to have similar membership figures. These figures would put the percentage of Christians in Egypt between 10% and 20% of the total population.

There is a small but historically significant non-immigrant population of the Baháʼí Faith, with estimates in 2008 placing the number at around 2,000 people, along with a far smaller community of Jews, with an estimated 13 adherents in 2014 (down from 80,000 prior to the 1953 dissolution of the monarchy and persecution during the decades long Arab–Israeli conflict).

A varying number of Egyptians will openly identify as atheist and agnostic, since public expressions of irreligion risk harassment and legal sanctions; most sources estimate the number of Egyptian atheists who openly identify as such to be in the millions, see Atheism and agnosticism below.

Freedom of religion and human rights
Freedom of belief and worship are formally recognized as absolute by the Egyptian Constitution under Article 64, but are effectively limited by government intervention and sectarian conflict. Some aspects of the country's laws are heavily founded on Islamic principles. Egyptian authorities only recognize Judaism, Islam and Christianity, allowing them public worship unlike other faiths. President Abdel Fattah el-Sisi and other senior figures have emphasized religious tolerance. In 2019, Sisi's cabinet approved a number of churches. Authorities however, have often failed to sanction or take stringent action against mobs who have indulged in violence against Christians. While construction of mosques is freely allowed by the authorities without any intervention, they have sometimes let mob rule dictate that even registered churches be closed down. Christians have also been consistently targeted by Islamic State of Iraq and Syria. Contempt or blasphemy against a religion can be charged under section 98 (f) of the Egyptian Penal Code. Conversion from Islam to any other faith is not recognized officially, though issues have also occurred for those converting to Islam. The government also discriminates against Islamic religious minority groups, most notably Shi'a Muslims, who face open official discrimination, including being barred from admission to Al-Azhar University.

In 2006 Egypt's Supreme Administrative Court made a clear legal distinction between "recognized religions" (i.e., Islam, Christianity, and Judaism) and all other religious beliefs. This ruling effectively delegitimizes and forbids practice of all but the three Abrahamic religions, and made it necessary for non-Abrahamic religious communities to either commit perjury or be denied Egyptian identification cards (see Egyptian identification card controversy), until a 2008 Cairo court case ruled that unrecognized religious minorities may obtain birth certificates and identification documents, so long as they omit their religion on court documents.

Restrictions on conversion
While freedom of religion is guaranteed by the Egyptian constitution, according to Human Rights Watch, "Egyptians are able to convert to Islam generally without difficulty, but Muslims who convert to Christianity face difficulties in getting new identity papers and some have been arrested for allegedly forging such documents. The Coptic community, however, takes pains to prevent conversions from Christianity to Islam due to the ease with which Christians can often become Muslim. Public officials, being conservative themselves, intensify the complexity of the legal procedures required to recognize the religion change as required by law. Security agencies will sometimes claim that such conversions from Islam to Christianity (or occasionally vice versa) may stir social unrest, and thereby justify themselves in wrongfully detaining the subjects, insisting that they are simply taking steps to prevent likely social troubles from happening. In 2007, a Cairo administrative court denied 45 citizens the right to obtain identity papers documenting their reversion to Christianity after converting to Islam. However, in February 2008 the Supreme Administrative Court overturned the decision, allowing 12 citizens who had reverted to Christianity to re-list their religion on identity cards, but they will specify that they had adopted Islam for a brief period of time.

Marriage
Egyptian state laws allow Muslim men to marry Christian or Jewish women but do not allow Christian or Jewish men to marry Muslim women.

Relations with the Coptic minority

Coptic Christians, being the largest religious minority in Egypt, are the most negatively affected by possibly discriminatory legislation. Copts in Egypt have faced increasing marginalization since the 1952 coup d'état led by Gamal Abdel Nasser. Until recently, the Christians in Egypt were required to obtain presidential approval for even minor repairs in churches. Although the law was eased in 2005 by handing down the authority of approval to the governors, Copts continue to face many obstacles in building new churches. These obstacles are not as much in building mosques.

Muslims and Christians share a common history and national identity; however, at times religious tensions have arisen, and individual acts of prejudice and violence occur. The most significant was the 2000–2001 El Kosheh attacks, In which Muslims and Christians were involved in bloody, inter-religious clashes following a dispute between a Muslim and a Christian. "Twenty Christians and one Muslim were killed after violence broke out in the town of el-Kosheh, 440 kilometres (275 miles) south of Cairo." In 2005, in Kafr Salama village, Sharqiya governorate, an altercation between a Muslim and a Christian resulted in the death of the Muslim. Muslim villagers later attacked the Abu Sifin Church and several Christian homes and looted several shops before the authorities restored order. In 2006, one person, described by police as drunk and mad, attacked three churches in Alexandria, leaving one dead and from 5 to 16 injured, although the attacker was not linked to any organisation. On January 7, 2010, Muslim gunmen open fire on Christian worshipers leaving a church in Nag Hammadi resulting in the murder of nine Coptic Christians.
On January 1, 2011, at least 21 people were killed and 83 injured when a car bomb exploded outside a Coptic Christian church in Alexandria. On 7 May 2011, a church was burnt down in Cairo. Then on 14 October 2012 in the absence of security officials 2 Muslims from a group were killed after they tried to kidnap a woman from a Christian family.

In January 2013 when the Muslim Brotherhood was in power, Christian nonprofit organization Open Doors ranked Egypt as the 25th most difficult place to be a Christian, on their annual World Watch List.

Religions in Egypt

Recognized religions

Islam

Islam has been the state religion in Egypt since the amendment of the second article of the Egyptian constitution in the year 1980, before which Egypt was recognized as a secular country. The vast majority of Egyptian Muslims are Sunni, with a small Mu'tazila, Shia Twelvers and Ismailism communities making up the remainder. A significant number of Sunni Egyptians also follow native Sufi orders. Egypt hosts the most important Sunni institution in the world, Al-Azhar University. It is the oldest Islamic institution of higher studies (founded around 970 CE), and is considered by many to be the oldest extant university in the world.

The Shia Ismaili caliphate of the Fatimids made Egypt their center, and made Cairo their capital. Egypt's various social groups and classes apply Islam differently in their daily lives. The literate theologians of Al-Azhar generally reject the popular version of Islam practised by religious preachers and peasants in the countryside, which is heavily Sufi-influenced. Sufism has flourished in Egypt since Islam was first adopted. Most upper- and middle-class Muslims believed either that religious expression is a private matter for each individual or that Islam should play a more dominant role in public life. Islamic religious revival movements, whose appeal cuts across class lines, have been present in most cities and in many villages for a long time.

According to the constitution of Egypt, any new legislation must at least implicitly agree with Islamic law. The mainstream Hanafi school of Sunni Islam is largely controlled by the state, through Wizaret Al-Awkaf (Ministry of Religious Affairs). Al-Awkaf controls all mosques and supervises Muslim clerics, but the Shafi'i and Maliki madhhabs were mixed together. Imams are trained in Imam vocational schools and at Al-Azhar. The ministry supports Sunni Islam and has commissions authorized to give Fatwā judgements on Islamic issues.

Scholars estimate that Shia Muslims comprise 1 percent of the population. There are very small numbers of Dawoodi Bohra Muslims, Ahmadi Muslims, and expatriate members of various groups in Egypt

Christianity

The Coptic Christian population in Egypt is the largest Christian community in the Middle East and North Africa standing at between 5% – 15% of Egypt's population according to different statistics. About 95% of Egypt's Christians are members of the Coptic Orthodox Church of Alexandria. an Oriental Orthodox Church, Traditionally believed to be established in the 1st century C.E. by Saint Mark. The Church is headed by the Pope of the Coptic Orthodox Church of Alexandria, attests to Egypt's strong Christian heritage. It has a followers of approximately 10 million Christians worldwide.

Other native Egyptian Christians are adherents of the Coptic Catholic Church, the Coptic Evangelical Church and various Coptic Protestant denominations. Non-native Christian communities are largely found in the urban regions of Alexandria and Cairo, and are members of the Greek Orthodox Church of Alexandria, the Melkite Greek Catholic Church, the Armenian Apostolic Church, the Latin Catholic Church, the Episcopal/Anglican Province of Alexandria, the Maronite Church, the Armenian Catholic Church, the Chaldean Catholic Church, the Syriac Catholic Church, or the Syriac Orthodox Church.

Significant minorities within Egypt's Christian community include the following denominations:
Apostolic Catholic and Orthodox Churches:
The Coptic Catholic Church (an Eastern Catholic Church) has around 210,000 members in Egypt and roughly 50,000 adherents abroad. It is in union with the Pope in Rome. It is headed by the Coptic Catholic Patriarch of Alexandria, currently Ibrahim Isaac Sidrak.
The Greek Orthodox Church of Alexandria (an Eastern Orthodox Church) has around 350,000 adherents in Egypt. The Church has another 1.5 million adherents in Africa and between 10,000 and 15,000 ex-patriates in Europe, North and South America. The current Greek Orthodox Patriarch of Alexandria is Pope Theodoros II.
The Melkite Greek Catholic Church (an Eastern Catholic Church) has about 7,000 members in Egypt. The eparchy of Egypt is looked after by a Protosyncellus, and has between 35,000 and 50,000 ex-patriates in Europe, North and South America, and Australia.
The Armenian Apostolic Church (an Oriental Orthodox Church) has around 7,000 adherents in Egypt. Most of them follow the Holy See of Echmiadzin in Armenia, rather than the Holy See of Cilicia in Lebanon.
The Latin Catholic Church has around 7,000 adherents in Egypt. Most are citizens born in Egypt but of foreign descent, like Italians, Maltese and French, or members of the foreign diplomatic corps in Egypt. There are very few native Christian Egyptians who adhere to the Latin Church, and those who do (several hundreds) do so mainly through marriage.
The Maronite Church (an Eastern Catholic Church) has around 5,000 adherents in Egypt.
The Armenian Catholic Church (an Eastern Catholic Church) has around 1,200 adherents in Egypt.
The Chaldean Catholic Church (an Eastern Catholic Church) has about 500 members in Egypt.
The Syriac Catholic Church (an Eastern Catholic Church) has around 2,000 adherents in Egypt.
The Syriac Orthodox Church (an Oriental Orthodox Church) has a very small population in Egypt, numbering between 450 and 500. Most are students of the Catechetical School of Alexandria, or foreign students studying in Egyptian universities.

Protestant churches also exist in Egypt. The total number of Protestants in Egypt is around 200,000.  they are:
The Episcopal/Anglican Province of Alexandria (a province of the Anglican Communion) has between 10,000 and 15,000 members in Egypt.
The Evangelical Church of Egypt (Synod of the Nile) (a Protestant Church) has around 140,000 members in Egypt.
The Assemblies of God Church, which has around 40,000 adherents in Egypt.
The Free Methodist Church, which has 120 churches and has around 10,000 adherents in Egypt.
The Christian Brethren Church, which has around 5,000 adherents in Egypt.
The Pentecostal Church of God, which has Church around 3,500 adherents in Egypt.
The Pentecostal Holiness Church, which has 1,400 adherents in Egypt.
The Church of God of Prophecy, which has 1,100 adherents in Egypt.
The Seventh-day Adventist Church has 852 adherents in Egypt.

Judaism

Before 1956 and according to the 1948 census there were 65,639 Egyptian Jews, including Karaites. Jews participated in all aspects of Egypt's social, economic and political life; one of the most ardent Egyptian nationalists, Yaqub Sanu' (Abu Naddara), was Jewish, as were the musician Dawoud Husni, popular singer Leila Mourad and filmmaker Togo Mizrahi. For a while, Jews from across the Ottoman Empire and Europe were attracted to Egypt due to the relative harmony that characterized the local religious landscape in the 19th and early 20th centuries. After the 1956 Suez Crisis, a great number of Jews were expelled by Gamal Abdel Nasser. Their Egyptian citizenship was revoked and their properties were confiscated. A steady stream of emigration of Egyptian Jews followed, reaching a peak after the Six-Day War with Israel in 1967. As of mid-2016, there were a total of 6 Jews remaining in Cairo, including their spiritual leader, Magda Tania Haroun, all women over the age of 65. There are a further 12 Jews in the city of Alexandria, whose spiritual leader is Ben Youssef Gaon.

Unrecognized and persecuted beliefs

Ahmadiyya Islam

The Ahmadiyya movement in Egypt, which numbers up to 7,000 to 50,000 adherents in the country, was established in 1922 but has seen an increase in hostility and government repression as of the 21st century. The Al-Azhar University has denounced the Ahmadis and Ahmadis have been hounded by police along with other Muslim groups deemed to be deviant under Egypt's defamation laws. On 15 March 2010, nine Ahmadis were detained due to their adherence to the movement.

Bahá'í Faith

In 1925, the Kingdom of Egypt became the first Islamic state to legally recognize the Baháʼísm Faith as an independent religion apart from Islam. The state-sanctioned persecution of Baháʼís started to emerge after the 1953 dissolution of the monarchy, culminating in Law 263 in 1960, banning all Baháʼí institutions and community activities in Egypt. Reports in 2006 revealed that, as followers of the Baháʼí Faith had difficulty obtaining documentation from government authorities, and police regularly detain people who do not have correct documentation, some Baháʼís frequently stayed home to avoid possible arrest. In 2008 a court case allowed Baháʼís to obtain birth certificates and identification documents, so long as they omit their religion on court documents.

Informal estimates about the Baháʼí population in Egypt suggest that, in 2006, there were approximately 2,000 Baháʼís resident in Egypt, though other estimates go as high as 6,900 adherents in 2010.

Since their faith is not officially recognized by the state, they were not allowed to use it on their national identity cards. Without valid identity cards Baháʼís encounter difficulty registering their children in school, opening bank accounts, and establishing businesses. On 16 December 2006, after only one hearing, the High Court of Egypt ruled against the Baháʼís, stating that the government would not recognize their religion in official identification cards. The ruling left Baháʼís unable to obtain ID cards, birth certificates, or death certificates. However, on January 29, 2008 Cairo's court of Administrative Justice, ruling on two related court cases, ruled in favour of the Baháʼís, allowing them to obtain birth certificates and identification documents, so long as they omit their religion on court documents. The ruling accepted the compromise solution offered by the Baháʼís, allowing for them to obtain identification papers without the Baháʼí Faith being officially recognized.

During and since the 2011 Egyptian revolution tensions have remained high, including homes being burnt, though Baháʼís made ongoing efforts to contribute to the dialog. Since 2011 Baháʼís remain concerned, noting such things as a 2012 statement by a Salafi spokesman that "We will prosecute the Bahai's  on charge of treason".

Hinduism

Atheism, agnosticism, and irreligion

It is difficult to quantify number of atheist or agnostic Egyptians due to social stigma against publicly identifying as non-religious and a lack of official statistics. Public statements deemed critical of Islam or Christianity can be tried under the country's blasphemy law. Outspoken atheists, like Alber Saber, have been convicted under this law. Blasphemy cases are not initiated by the general prosecutor, and only occur if a citizen takes the step of suing the person engaging in blasphemy, a procedure similar to Antragsdelikt in civil law legal systems. In 2000, an openly atheist Egyptian writer, who called for the establishment of a local association for atheists, was tried on charges of insulting Islam in four of his books.

According to the 2020 US report on international religious freedom there is no reliable estimates of the number of atheists in Egypt. A study at the University of Kent, citing a 2018 survey by Arab Barometer, stated that around 11% of Egyptians identified themselves as not religious. According to the same Arab Barometer survey Wave V only 0.1% of Egyptians said they were Atheist while 9.6% said they were Christian and 90.4% said they were Muslim In the same Arab Barometer survey, about 20% of young Egyptians described themselves as not religious. Absent official figures, sources consistently report that the number is increasing steadily. Egyptian media has since 2011 reported increases in the number of nonbelievers and atheists publicly coming out; however, atheism or skepticism is not a recent phenomenon in Egypt. Despite the lack of clarity with regard to absolute numbers, there is a noticeable increase in young Egyptians coming out for nonbelieving and publicly testifying they have left the faith, especially on the internet. Many Egyptian irreligious/atheist intellectuals encourage irreligious Egyptians and Egyptian atheists to speak up and come out of the closet, a trend which is visible across both Islam and Christianity, and involves both Egyptian men and women.

Discrimination against atheists in Egypt is mainly the result of conservative social traditions and the religious establishments in the country, as the laws and policies in Egypt protect religious freedom but punish those who ridicule or insult the Abrahamic religions by words or writing, whereas insulting other faiths like Buddhism or Hinduism is not punishable by Egyptian law but insulting Islam, Christianity, or Judaism is. Atheists or irreligious people cannot change their official religious status, thus statistically they are counted as followers of their parent's religion, whether it is Islam or Christianity.

In a 2011 Pew Research poll of 1,798 Muslims in Egypt, 63% of those surveyed supported "the death penalty for people who leave the Muslim religion" However, no such punishment actually exists in the country. In January 2018 the head of the parliament's religious committee, Amr Hamroush, suggested a bill to make atheism illegal, stating that "it [atheism] must be criminalised and categorised as contempt of religion because atheists have no doctrine and try to insult the Abrahamic religions". In 2014 the Ministry of Youth and the Ministry of Awqaf announced a joint strategy to combat the spread of what they categorized as "harmful ideas" among the nation's youth, including atheism. Despite hostility towards them, atheists in Egypt have become increasingly vocal online since the Egyptian revolution of 2011 and particularly after the ouster of Morsi in 2013.

See also

Ancient Egyptian religion
Persecution of Copts
Christianity in Egypt
List of Coptic Churches in Egypt
List of Coptic Orthodox Churches in Canada
List of Coptic Orthodox Churches in the United States
Hinduism in Egypt

Notes

References